Jackson Rancheria is the landbase for the Jackson Rancheria of Me-Wuk Indians of California, a federally recognized tribe of Miwok people, located near Jackson, California. It is located in Amador County, about midway between Jackson and Pine Grove. The reservation operates the Jackson Rancheria Casino Resort, located on its territory.

Education
The ranchería is served by the Amador County Unified School District.

Notes 

Miwok
Amador County, California
Native American tribes in California
Federally recognized tribes in the United States
American Indian reservations in California